The 2023 Judo Grand Slam Tbilisi will be held at the Olympic Palace in Tbilisi, Georgia from 24 to 26 March 2023 as part of the IJF World Tour and during the 2024 Summer Olympics qualification period.

Prize money
The sums written are per medalist, bringing the total prizes awarded to €154,000.

References

External links
 

2023 Judo Grand Slam
2023 IJF World Tour
Grand Slam 2023
Judo
Judo
Judo
Judo
Judo Grand Slam Tbilisi